Buck & Buddy Blow the Blues is an album by trumpeter Buck Clayton and saxophonist Buddy Tate which was recorded in 1961 and released on the Swingville label.

Reception 

Scott Yanow of AllMusic states, "Although the musicians all play well on this mainstream set, few surprises or exciting moments occur and the performances are not as memorable as one would expect".

Track listing 
All compositions by Buck Clayton except where noted.
 "Rompin' at Red Bank" (Buddy Tate) – 6:36
 "Blue Creek" (Tate) – 6:30
 "A Swinging Doll" – 3:54
 "Dallas Delight" – 4:35
 "Don't Mind If I Do" (Tate) – 8:05
 "Blue Breeze" – 4:11
 "Blue Ebony" – 5:55

Personnel 
Buck Clayton – trumpet
Buddy Tate – tenor saxophone, clarinet
Sir Charles Thompson – piano
Gene Ramey – bass
Gus Johnson – drums

References 

Buddy Tate albums
Buck Clayton albums
1961 albums
Swingville Records albums
Albums recorded at Van Gelder Studio
Albums produced by Esmond Edwards